Hugh John Maxwell Dykes, Baron Dykes, (born 17 May 1939) is a British politician and member of the House of Lords. Initially a Europhile Conservative, he later defected to the Liberal Democrats.

Family and education
Dykes was educated at Weston-super-Mare Grammar School, Somerset, followed by Pembroke College, Cambridge.
He married Susan Margaret Smith in 1966 and they had three sons; the couple divorced in 2000. Dykes has been in a relationship with Sarah Allder since 2003.

Life and career
After unsuccessfully contesting the safe Labour seat of Tottenham in 1966, Dykes served as a Conservative Member of Parliament for Harrow East from 1970 until he lost his seat at the 1997 general election. He also served as a Member of the European Parliament between 1974 and 1977. While an MP, Dykes served in the Ministry of Defence and the Cabinet Office in Edward Heath's government.

Following the defeat of Kenneth Clarke in the Conservative leadership contest following the 1997 general election, Dykes joined the Liberal Democrats. Within a year of joining the party, he came to serve as an adviser to Paddy Ashdown on European Union affairs.

He has served as chairman of the European Movement-UK and as vice president of the British-German Association. In 1991 he was awarded the German Order of Merit, followed by the Luxembourg Médaille pour l'Europe in 1993.

In 2004, Dykes was raised to the peerage as Baron Dykes, of Harrow Weald in the London Borough of Harrow. The same year he received the French Légion d'Honneur.

References

External links 
 
 TheyWorkForYou page on Lord Dykes
Lord Dykes profile at the site of Liberal Democrats

1939 births
Living people
Alumni of Pembroke College, Cambridge
Conservative Party (UK) MPs for English constituencies
Liberal Democrats (UK) life peers
UK MPs 1970–1974
UK MPs 1974
UK MPs 1974–1979
UK MPs 1979–1983
UK MPs 1983–1987
UK MPs 1987–1992
UK MPs 1992–1997
Conservative Party (UK) MEPs
Commanders Crosses of the Order of Merit of the Federal Republic of Germany
MEPs for the United Kingdom 1973–1979
Recipients of the Legion of Honour
Life peers created by Elizabeth II